Peddakarpamula is a village in Nagarkurnool district, Telangana, India, 24 km from Nagar Kurnool. It is the major gram panchayat in Kollapur constituency. The Present MLA is Mr.HarshavardhanReddy

Demography
The village is administrated by a Sarpanch who is an elected representative of village as per constitution of India and Panchayati raj (India).

References

Villages in Nagarkurnool district